The 1977 Kansas City Chiefs season was the franchise's 8th season in the National Football League, the 15th as the Kansas City Chiefs, and the 18th overall. This season was the worst in franchise history until the 2008 season, with the Chiefs winning only two of fourteen games. After an 0–5 start, Head coach Paul Wiggin was fired following a 44–7 loss to Cleveland in Week 7. Tom Bettis took over as interim head coach for the rest of the season. The team endured a six-game losing streak to conclude the season at 2–12.

The last remaining active members of the 1977 Kansas City Chiefs were quarterback Tony Adams and wide receiver Henry Marshall, who both played their final NFL games in the 1987 season, although Adams missed the 1979 to 1986 seasons.

Off-season

1977 NFL Draft

Roster

Season summary
An 0–5 start doomed the squad with a 44–7 loss at Cleveland (10/30) effectively sealing Wiggin's fate. Despite the club's record Wiggin was still a popular figure in Kansas City, but was nonetheless relieved of his duties on Halloween, marking the first in-season coaching switch in team history, and the last until 2011, when Todd Haley was fired with three games remaining. Wiggin concluded his tenure with an 11–24 record.

Defensive backs coach Tom Bettis was named interim coach and claimed a 20–10 victory vs. Green Bay (11/6) in the franchise's initial contest under his direction, but it was the only victory of his brief head coaching tenure. The team endured a six-game losing streak to conclude the season at 2–12. (Ironically, Haley's successor, Romeo Crennel, also won his first game in charge against the Packers at home; Green Bay entered that game 13–0.)

Bettis and the remainder of the coaching staff assembled by Wiggin were released on December 19, one day after a 21–20 loss at Oakland (12/18) in the regular season finale. Marv Levy, the former head coach of the CFL's Montreal Alouettes, was named the fourth head coach in franchise history on December 20.

The heart and soul of the Chiefs once-vaunted defense departed when roommates Willie Lanier and Jim Lynch, who both joined the club together as second-round draft picks in 1967, retired following the 1977 campaign. Baltimore later acquired Lanier's rights in a trade, but failed to lure him out of retirement.

By managing to win only twice in the 1977 season, the team was given the second pick in the 1978 NFL Draft.

Schedule

Preseason

Regular season

Game summaries

Week 1: at New England Patriots

Week 2: vs. San Diego Chargers

Week 3: vs. Oakland Raiders

Week 4: at Denver Broncos

Week 5: vs. Baltimore Colts

Week 6: at San Diego Chargers

Week 7: at Cleveland Browns

Week 8: vs. Green Bay Packers

Week 9: at Chicago Bears

Week 10: vs. Denver Broncos

Week 11: at Houston Oilers

Week 12: vs. Cincinnati Bengals

Week 13: vs. Seattle Seahawks

Week 14: at Oakland Raiders

Standings

References

External links 
 1977 Kansas City Chiefs on Database Football

1977 Kansas City Chiefs season
Kansas City Chiefs
Kansas